Daniel Nelson (born Bethesda, Maryland, 1 May 1965) is a composer living in Sweden.

He grew up in Sweden from 1970 to 1985. Then from 1985 at the Peabody Conservatory he took composition studies under Jean Eichelberger-Ivey, followed by MA studies at the University of Chicago with Ralph Shapey.

He works as a composer in Sweden. His oeuvre consists mainly of orchestral and instrumental works, but includes one opera Stolthet & fördom (2011). Of his concertante works, his Metallëphônic (2002) for tuba and orchestra has been performed over 40 times around the world.

References

External links 
Personal website
 http://www.composernelson.com/

1965 births
Swedish composers
Swedish male composers
Living people